John Joseph Harding (January 4, 1898 – February 24, 1963) was an American football, basketball, and baseball player, coach, and college athletics administrator. He served as the head football coach at St. Thomas College—now the University of Scranton—from 1926 to 1936 and at the University of Miami from 1937 to 1942 and 1945 to 1947, compiling a career college football record of 103–69–12. Harding was also the head basketball coach at St. Thomas from 1926 to 1937, amassing record of 119–56. He was the head baseball coach at Miami in 1940 and 1959, tallying a mark of 16–14–1. Harding was inducted into the College Football Hall of Fame as a coach in 1980.

During his two stints coaching football at Miami, Harding compiled a 54–32–3 (.624) record and led the Hurricanes to four seasons of eight or more wins (1938, 1941, 1945, 1946). After resigning from coaching football, he served as the athletic director at Miami for 15 years until his death from cancer, on February 24, 1963, in Miami, Florida.

Head coaching record

Football

See also
 List of college football head coaches with non-consecutive tenure

References

External links
 

1898 births
1963 deaths
American men's basketball players
Basketball coaches from Pennsylvania
Basketball players from Pennsylvania
Miami Hurricanes athletic directors
Miami Hurricanes baseball coaches
Miami Hurricanes football coaches
Pittsburgh Panthers baseball players
Pittsburgh Panthers men's basketball players
Pittsburgh Panthers football players
Scranton Royals football coaches
Scranton Royals men's basketball coaches
College men's basketball head coaches in the United States
College Football Hall of Fame inductees
People from Luzerne County, Pennsylvania
Players of American football from Pennsylvania
Deaths from cancer in Florida